A Wreck A Tangle is a 2000 Australian film directed by Scott Patterson starring Anna Lise Phillips, Damian Walshe-Howling and Rebecca Frith.

Along with Fresh Air it was one of the first of the SBS Million Dollar Movies program.

References

External links
A Wreck, A Tangle at IMDb
Film page at Slam Cam Films
A Wreck a Tangle at Oz Movies

2000 films
2000 drama films
2000 television films
Australian drama television films
2000s Australian films